Michael Ball is an entrepreneur best known for founding the fashion brand, Rock & Republic and his charitable efforts with his Rock the Cure foundation and the Boys and Girls Club.

Ball was inducted to the Council of Fashion Designers of America in 2007 and received the Spirit of Life Award  from City of Hope for his charity work with Rock the Cure.

Notes

External links

Michael Ball interview with Donny Deutsch (YouTube)
rockandrepublic.com
CFDA inducts 30 new members
rockthecurefoundation.com
Fighting cancer through haute couture

Living people
American fashion businesspeople
Brand founders
Year of birth missing (living people)